Glenn Withrow (born November 24, 1953) is an American actor.

Early life 

Withrow was born in Highland Heights, Kentucky. He has one older brother, Jeff, and one younger brother, Roger. Withrow attended Campbell County High School in Alexandria, Kentucky. Glenn was very active in high school sports, playing on the football team and was runner up in the state wrestling tournament in spite of the fact that he had the flu during the competition.

Career 
Withrow began acting in the mid 1970s after moving to Los Angeles, and had roles in films such as The Outsiders as Tim Shepard, Rumble Fish and Peggy Sue Got Married. He has had roles in five productions directed by Francis Ford Coppola.

He is the CEO of In House Media, Inc., a film production company, who produced the feature film "The Mooring" under their subsidiary partnership, In House Media Film Partners. He has also taught acting classes with his wife Hallie Todd.

He directed the full-length feature film The Mooring, which was released on DVD, digital download and Video on Demand on February 19, 2013, by Lionsgate. Withrow also produced and co-wrote the film with his wife and daughter.

Personal life 

Withrow has been married to actress Hallie Todd since 1991. The couple have a daughter.

Filmography

References

External links 

 In House Media, Inc 
 The Last Champion Official Movie Website
 The Mooring Official Movie Website

1953 births
Living people
American male film actors
American male television actors
People from Campbell County, Kentucky
Male actors from Kentucky
20th-century American male actors